Valentina Pollarolo Guiraldes (Santiago, February 20, 1974) is a Chilean actress and screenwriter.
She was a regular face on Chilean telenovelas of the '90s. Her most popular character was Paola Cárcamo in the TV series Playa Salvaje and its spin-off show Los Cárcamo.

Biography 

In 1990, shortly after leaving school and while she was in her first year of Art, she appeared on the TV series Acércate más as Catalina Guerra's younger sister. Since then, she was a regular face of the dramatic productions of the decade like Estúpido Cupido and Sucupira on TVN. In 1997, she emigrated to Channel 13 where she participated in productions such as Playa salvaje, Marparaíso and Cerro Alegre.

Her role as Paola Cárcamo in Playa Salvaje was very popular as the rest of her fictional family were. This led to a family-based sitcom, Los Cárcamo, which ran for two seasons in 1998 and 1999. Due to the success, TVN, Channel 13's main rival, acquired the series to broadcast on its international signal. On her part, Pollarolo was even invited, characterized as Paola Cárcamo to the prime TV show of the time, Viva el Lunes, in a chapter where the then number one tennis player Marcelo Ríos also appeared.

In 2001, she gave him a break from the small screen to make her debut in theater with Tres noches de un sábado, under the direction of Andrés Céspedes. The following year she was in the production of the telenovela Buen partido, which meant her withdrawal from the TV genre.

After living in the Czech Republic with her husband, she returned to the country and dedicates herself to voice overs: she was the host of Radio Activa and the institutional voice of La Red. In 2012 she reappeared on television as the protagonist of a unique Vía X fiction called Pic nic.

In recent times she began to exploit her side as a screenwriter. In 2015 she participated by writing Preciosas on Channel 13, but she was raised by TVN to join the team of Un diablo con ángel. In addition, she is the author of a play called Juan, an imaginary story that was presented at Centro Mori.

Filmography

Telenovelas

TV Series

Scripts 

Juegos de poder (2019) – Original of Luis Ponce 
Dime quién fue (2018) – Original of Marcelo Castañón
Un diablo con ángel (2017) – Original of Marcelo Castañón
Preciosas (2016) – Original of Catalina Calcagni

References 

1974 births
20th-century Chilean actresses
21st-century Chilean actresses
Chilean television actresses
Chilean telenovela actresses
Living people
Actresses from Santiago
Chilean screenwriters